Bamako shooting may refer to the following firearms incidents that have occurred in Bamako:

 March 2015 Bamako shooting
 2015 Bamako hotel attack
 June 2017 Bamako attack